Pornchai Ardjinda (born March 14, 1984) is a retired professional footballer from Thailand. His nickname is "Pao." He was the 2010 Thai Division 1 League 2nd highest scorer with 16 goals. He used to be an airman in the Thai Air Force. He dropped down a division in 2011 to sign for his hometown team Ratchaburi.

Honours

Club
Ratchaburi F.C.
 Regional League Division 2 Champions (1) : 2011
 Thai Division 1 League Champions (1) : 2012

External links
 Goal.com 
 

1984 births
Living people
Pornchai Ardjinda
Pornchai Ardjinda
Association football forwards
Pornchai Ardjinda
Pornchai Ardjinda
Pornchai Ardjinda
Pornchai Ardjinda
Pornchai Ardjinda
Pornchai Ardjinda